The Bear Brook murders (also referred to as the Allenstown Four) are female American murder victims, two discovered in 1985 and two in 2000, at Bear Brook State Park in Allenstown, New Hampshire, United States. All four of the victims were either partially or completely skeletonized; they were believed to have died between 1977 and 1981.

In 2017, investigators named Terry Peder Rasmussen as the most likely suspect. Rasmussen's identity was confirmed via DNA from a son from his first marriage. He was also confirmed, via DNA, to be the father of a 2-to-4-year-old girl who was one of the Bear Brook victims. Rasmussen is believed to be responsible for several other murders, including that of Denise Beaudin, his known girlfriend, who disappeared in 1981. Rasmussen was convicted and sentenced for the murder in 2002 of his then-wife, Eunsoon Jun; he died in prison in 2010.

In 2019, the three biologically related females were identified as a mother, Marlyse Elizabeth Honeychurch, and her two daughters (of different biological fathers) Marie Elizabeth Vaughn and Sarah Lynn McWaters, last seen in November 1978. The middle child, identified as Rasmussen's daughter, currently remains unidentified. Based on the date they disappeared, available documents and Rasmussen's activities, the victims most likely died between 1978 and 1981.

Discovery
On November 10, 1985, a hunter found a metal 55-gallon drum near the site of a burned-down store at Bear Brook State Park in Allenstown, New Hampshire. Inside were the bodies of an adult female and young girl, wrapped in plastic. Autopsies determined both had died of blunt trauma. The two were buried in an Allenstown cemetery with a tombstone that read: "Here lies the mortal remains known only to God of a woman aged 23-33 and a girl child aged 8-10. Their slain bodies were found on November 10th, 1985, in Bear Brook State Park. May their souls find peace in God’s loving care."

On May 9, 2000, the remains of two young girls were found near the first discovery site. These bodies were also in a metal 55-gallon drum, and police believe that all four murders occurred at roughly the same time, despite investigators inexplicably missing the second drum in 1985. According to investigators, the reason that it took so long for the second drum to be recovered is that it was located outside the proximity of the initial crime scene. The cause of death for these children was also blunt force trauma.

Examination

The adult, later identified as Honeychurch, was determined to be Caucasian with possible Native American ancestry. Her age at the time of death was estimated to be 23 to 33. Her teeth showed significant dental work, including multiple fillings and three extractions. The three girls were thought to also have some Native American heritage; they had light or European-American complexions.

The girl found with the adult female, later identified as Vaughn, was between 5 and 11 years old. Her hair was wavy and light brown; she had no dental fillings.

The middle child, currently unidentified, also had a gap between her front teeth and died at an age between 2 and 4. She had an overbite, which was probably noticeable. She also may have suffered from anemia. DNA proved this child was fathered by Terry Peder Rasmussen. In February 2020, it was announced that DNA analysis suggested the child was primarily Caucasian, with slight Asian, African, and Native American heritage. The organization later released an updated version of the child's facial reconstruction.

Investigation
In the early days of the investigation, authorities publicized the case in the United States and some parts of Canada. At least ten possible identities were ruled out. Despite hundreds of leads, the bodies were not identified.

In June 2013, new versions of the victims' facial reconstructions were created by the National Center for Missing & Exploited Children. These versions incorporated their dental information, showing how their teeth could have affected the appearance of their faces. The reconstructions were created in black and white, as their skin tones and eye colors could not be determined.

In November 2015, the National Center for Missing & Exploited Children released a third set of reconstructions of the four victims at a news conference at the New Hampshire State Attorney General's office.

DNA and isotopic evidence
In 2014, police announced that DNA profiling had revealed through MtDNA that the woman, and oldest and youngest girls were maternally related. This means that the woman could have been the girls' mother, aunt, or older sister. In 2015, the woman was identified as the mother of the two girls.

Other forensic information showed that the woman and children lived together in the Northeastern United States between two weeks and three months before their deaths. Investigators have concluded the woman and two of the children lived in the area where their bodies were found. Advanced forensic testing showed the 2-to-4-year-old girl (since identified as Rasmussen's daughter) probably spent most of her childhood in either the upper Northeast or upper Midwest, perhaps Wisconsin. In 2019, however, it is stated that the nonrelated child most likely originated from Arizona, Texas, California or Oregon, although additional locations cannot be excluded.

Later developments

In January 2017, it was announced that Denise Beaudin, who had been missing since 1981, was connected to the murders. Beaudin disappeared from Manchester, New Hampshire, along with her young daughter and then-boyfriend Robert "Bob" Evans.  Evans later abandoned a young girl, "Lisa", at a campground, and she was found to not be his daughter. Beaudin was not reported missing until 2016, when her daughter resurfaced alive and well in California after there was more publicity about the murders and Beaudin's disappearance. The daughter is keeping her name private.

The National Center for Missing & Exploited Children subsequently announced that an unidentified man, known by the alias "Robert Evans," was found through DNA to be the father of the middle child (who was not related to the three other victims). Authorities believed that Evans was the killer of the four Bear Brook victims, but did not elaborate. 

Authorities said in 2018 that the Bear Brook woman was not Beaudin. They also said that "Robert Evans" was a pseudonym and that the man's legal identity was unknown.

Evans died in prison in December 2010. He had been convicted and sentenced as Evans for the 2002 murder and dismemberment of his wife at the time, Eunsoon Jun, a chemist in California.

In June 2017, police released a video of a police interview of Evans in hopes of finding his true identity. Two months later, Robert Evans was confirmed as Terry Peder Rasmussen, through Y-DNA testing from a DNA sample contributed by one of his sons from what is believed to be his first marriage. Born in 1943, Rasmussen was a native of Denver, Colorado. He married in 1969, had four children, and lived in Phoenix, Arizona, and Redwood City, California. His wife left him between 1973 and 1974 and his family last saw him around Christmas 1974. One of his sons from this marriage provided the DNA sample that confirmed Rasmussen as Evans in June 2017. The senior Rasmussen, known as the Chameleon killer, is believed to have used "at least five different aliases in a decades-long run of crimes across the country, including at least five homicides, and likely more."

Identifications
On June 6, 2019, New Hampshire investigators held a press conference regarding the case and revealed the identities of three of the victims. Marlyse Elizabeth Honeychurch (b. 1954) was the mother of Marie Elizabeth Vaughn (b. 1971) and Sarah Lynn McWaters (b. 1977), all of whom went missing from La Puente, California, around Thanksgiving 1978, while she was dating Rasmussen. Honeychurch had an argument with her mother and left the residence, never contacting her relatives again. Honeychurch may have adopted the alias name "Elizabeth Evans" to use in legal documents during May 1980. It is believed that all four victims were murdered before 1981, as Rasmussen was known to have left New Hampshire after this time.

Sarah's younger half brother, who had never met her, created a post in 1999 on the Ancestry.com website in efforts to locate her. She was born in Hawaiian Gardens, California, when her father was in the Marines. Similar posts also aided in the identifications of the victims.

Marlyse had previously married Marie's father in June 1971 and divorced by 1974. She married Sarah's father in September 1974, and the two were separated by the time she was known to be dating Rasmussen. The children both went through periods where they were in the custody of their fathers, but Marlyse would later regain guardianship. By October 1978, Sarah's father was seeing another woman and Sarah was presumably in the care of her mother.

Honeychurch and Vaughn's funeral was held in November 2019 in Allenstown, during which they were given a new headstone bearing their names. In attendance were members of Honeychurch's family and Rasmussen's daughter from his first marriage. Sarah was laid to rest in Connecticut, closer to her father's family.

The fourth victim's identity is not yet known, but investigators stated that through advanced DNA testing they could confirm the child was Rasmussen's. They have so far been unable to identify who the mother of the child is and whether or not she may still be alive. In February 2020, a new rendering of the fourth victim was released by the National Center for Missing & Exploited Children and New Hampshire State Police.

See also
 Denise Daneault, missing person last seen in June 1980 near where Rasmussen was living at the time
 List of murdered American children
 List of unsolved deaths

References

Further reading

External links

1977 murders in the United States
1978 murders in the United States
1979 murders in the United States
1980 murders in the United States
1981 murders in the United States
1977 deaths
1978 deaths
1979 deaths
1980 deaths
1981 deaths
Crimes in New Hampshire
Deaths by beating in the United States
Female murder victims
History of women in New Hampshire
Incidents of violence against girls
Murdered American children
November 1978 events in the United States
People from Merrimack County, New Hampshire
People murdered in New Hampshire
Serial murders in the United States
Unidentified American children
Unidentified murder victims in the United States
Unsolved murders in the United States
Violence against women in the United States